They All Lie is a Spanish television series with thriller, black humour and parodical elements created and directed by Pau Freixas and produced by Movistar+ in collaboration with Filmax. It features an ensemble cast that includes Irene Arcos, Amaia Salamanca, Natalia Verbeke, Miren Ibarguren, Leonardo Sbaraglia, Juan Diego Botto and Ernesto Alterio. It premiered on 28 January 2022.

Premise 
A video showing the sexual activities of a school teacher with one of her students (and son of her best friend) is made public, breaking up the tranquility in Belmonte, a fictional exclusive residential development in the Catalan coastline. To make things worse, a corpse belonging to one of the neighbors is discovered in a cliff.

Cast

Production and release 
Produced by Movistar+ in collaboration with Filmax, the series began filming on 5 October 2020. Production worked in different locations across Barcelona, Girona and Tarragona. Consisting of 6 episodes featuring a running time of roughly 45 minutes, shooting wrapped by January 2021. The series was presented at the FesTVal in September 2021. It premiered on 28 January 2022.

References

External links 
 

Movistar+ network series
Spanish thriller television series
Television shows filmed in Spain
Spanish-language television shows
2020s Spanish drama television series
2020s Spanish comedy television series
2022 Spanish television series debuts
Television shows set in Catalonia